Old School Is the New School is the first album by Australian rock band, Intercooler. It was originally released in September 2002 via Rhythm Ace Records and distributed by MGM. The line-up of Phil Ballantyne on lead vocals and guitar, Michael Caso on guitar, Damon Cox on drums and vocals, and Joel Potter on bass guitar and vocals, had formed in the previous year. The album was recorded and mixed by Jeff Lovejoy at Rockinghorse, Arctic, Red Zeds and Black Box studios and mastered at Studios 301 by Steve Smart.

Old School Is the New School was re-released with three new tracks, "Tea Ball", "Country" and "It's Like a Girl", on 5 June 2006 by Silent Echo/MGM with the track, "Lovejoy" removed. The extra tracks also appear on Goodness of the Girl, a five-track extended play (September 2002).

Reception 

According to Oz Music Projects correspondent, Old School Is the New Schools tracks, "received Triple J airplay and the band found themselves playing venues on the East Coast regularly. During this time the band gathered support slots for bands such as Teenage Fanclub, The Buzzcocks and J.Mascis." A reviewer from Drum Media opined, "[its title is] a good commentary on current trends in the music industry and the style of Intercooler's music... [which is] fresh and devoid of rock cliches. This is an album which gives the listener the impression that Intercooler are having fun doing their thing and recording their music. This feeling easily transfers itself to the listener and makes [it] rewarding and enjoyable..."

Track listing

Original release

Personnel 

Intercooler members
 Phil Ballantyne – lead vocals, guitar
 Michael Caso – guitar
 Damon Cox – drums, vocals
 Joel Potter – bass guitar, vocals

Recording details
 Producer – Jeff Lovejoy at  Rockinghorse, Arctic, Red Zeds and Black Box studios
 Mastering – Steve Smart at Studios 301

References 

Intercooler (band) albums
2002 debut albums